Harpago arthriticus, common name : the arthritic spider conch,  is a species of sea snail, a marine gastropod mollusk in the family Strombidae, the true conchs.

Description

Distribution
This species is distributed in the Indian Ocean along the Aldabra Atoll, Kenya, Madagascar, the Maldives, the Mascarene Basin, Mauritius, Mozambique, Réunion, the Seychelles and Tanzania; in the Pacific Ocean along the Philippines.

References

 Taylor, J.D. (1973). Provisional list of the mollusca of Aldabra Atoll
 Richmond, M. (Ed.) (1997). A guide to the seashores of Eastern Africa and the Western Indian Ocean islands. Sida/Department for Research Cooperation, SAREC: Stockholm, Sweden. . 448 pp.

External links
 

Strombidae
Gastropods described in 1798